Growing pains are pains in the limbs during childhood.

Growing Pains may also refer to:

Film and television 
Growing Pains (1928 film), an Our Gang short subject, now lost
Growing Pains (1984 film), a teen comedy directed by Robert Houston
Growing Pains, an American television sitcom that ran on the ABC network from 1985 to 1992
The Growing Pains Movie, 2000 film based on the American sitcom
Growing Pains: Return of the Seavers, 2004 sequel to the above film
Growing Pains (British TV series), a British television drama
"Growing Pains" (New Batman Adventures), an episode of The New Batman Adventures
"Growing Pains" (The Flash), an episode of The Flash
"Growing Pains" (X-Men: Evolution), an episode of X-Men: Evolution
"Growing Pains" (The Vampire Diaries), an episode of The Vampire Diaries

Music
Growing, Pains, a 1997 album by Billie Myers
Growing Pains (Mary J. Blige album), 2007
Growing Pains (Dinosaur Pile-Up album), 2010
Growing Pains (Json album), 2012
Growing Pains, an album by rap artist Lexii Alijai
"Growing Pains", a song by Birdy from her 2016 album Beautiful Lies
"Growing Pains", a song by Ludacris from the 2001 album Word of Mouf
"Growing Pain", a song by Soul Asylum from their 1986 album Made to Be Broken
"Growing Pain", a song by Neck Deep from their 2014 album Wishful Thinking
"Growing Pains", a song by Donghae & Eunhyuk from their 2015 EP The Beat Goes On
"Growing Pains" (Alessia Cara song), 2018
Growing Pains, a 2022 album from Elevation Rhythm, a division of Elevation Worship

Other
Growing Pains (book), a 2006 autobiography by Billie Piper

See also
The Growing Paynes, an American sitcom that ran on the DuMont Television Network from 1948 to 1949